Victoriano Lorenzo is a corregimiento in San Miguelito District, Panamá Province, Panama with a population of 15,873 as of 2010. Its population as of 1990 was 17,317; its population as of 2000 was 17,328.

References

Corregimientos of Panamá Province
San Miguelito District